The Mykolaiv tram network is the part of the public transportation system that serves Mykolaiv, Ukraine.

External links 

 The Mykolaiv tram on Google Maps

Tram
Tram transport in Ukraine
Mykolaiv